, Plants of the World Online listed about 460 accepted species and hybrids in the genus Veronica. This includes species formerly placed in the genus Hebe.

A

Veronica abyssinica Fresen.
Veronica acinifolia L.
Veronica acrotheca Bornm. & Gauba
Veronica adamsii Cheeseman
Veronica × affinis (Cheeseman) Garn.-Jones
Veronica agrestis L.
Veronica alaskensis M.M.Mart.Ort. & Albach
Veronica alatavica Popov
Veronica albicans Petrie
Veronica albiflora (Pennell) Albach
Veronica allahuekberensis Öztürk
Veronica allionii Vill.
Veronica alpina L.
Veronica × altaica Kosachev
Veronica americana (Raf.) Schwein. ex Benth.
Veronica amoena M.Bieb.
Veronica amplexicaulis J.B.Armstr.
Veronica anagallis-aquatica L.
Veronica anagalloides Guss.
Veronica × andersonii Lindl. & Paxton
Veronica angustifolia (Vahl) Bernh.
Veronica angustissima (Cockayne) Garn.-Jones
Veronica annulata Cockayne ex Cheeseman
Veronica antalyensis M.A.Fisch., Erik & Sümbül
Veronica aphylla L.
Veronica aragonensis Stroh
Veronica archboldii Pennell
Veronica arcuata (B.G.Briggs & Ehrend.) B.G.Briggs
Veronica arenaria A.Cunn. ex Benth.
Veronica arenosa (Serg.) Boriss.
Veronica arganthera (Garn.-Jones, Bayly, W.G.Lee & Rance) Garn.-Jones
Veronica argute-serrata Regel & Schmalh.
Veronica armena Boiss. & A.Huet
Veronica armstrongii Johnson ex J.B.Armstr.
Veronica arvensis L.
Veronica aucheri Boiss.
Veronica austriaca L.
Veronica avromanica M.A.Fisch.
Veronica aznavourii Dörfl.

B

Veronica bachofenii Heuff.
Veronica balansae Stroh
Veronica baranetzkii Bordz.
Veronica barkeri Cockayne
Veronica barrelieri H.Schott ex Roem. & Schult.
Veronica baumgartenii Roem. & Schult.
Veronica baylyi Garn.-Jones
Veronica beccabunga L.
Veronica bellidioides L.
Veronica benthamii Hook.f.
Veronica besseya M.M.Mart.Ort. & Albach
Veronica × bidwillii Hook.
Veronica biggarii Cockayne
Veronica biloba Schreb. ex L.
Veronica birleyi N.E.Br.
Veronica bishopiana Petrie
Veronica blakelyi (B.G.Briggs & Ehrend.) B.G.Briggs
Veronica × blockiana (Trávn.) Albach
Veronica bogosensis Tumadz.
Veronica bollonsii Cockayne
Veronica bombycina Boiss. & Kotschy
Veronica borisovae Holub
Veronica bozakmanii M.A.Fisch.
Veronica brachysiphon (Summerh.) Bean
Veronica brassii (Pennell) Albach
Veronica breviracemosa W.R.B.Oliv.
Veronica buchananii Hook.f.
Veronica bucharica B.Fedtsch.
Veronica bullii (Eaton) M.M.Mart.Ort. & Albach
Veronica bungei Boiss.

C

Veronica cachemirica Gand.
Veronica caespitosa Boiss.
Veronica calcicola (Bayly & Garn.-Jones) Garn.-Jones
Veronica californica M.M.Mart.Ort. & Albach
Veronica callitrichoides Kom.
Veronica calycina R.Br.
Veronica campylopoda Boiss.
Veronica cana Wall. ex Benth.
Veronica canbyi (Pennell) M.M.Mart.Ort. & Albach
Veronica canterburiensis J.B.Armstr.
Veronica capillipes Nevski
Veronica capitata Royle ex Benth.
Veronica capsellicarpa Dubovik
Veronica cardiocarpa (Kar. & Kir.) Walp.
Veronica carminea Albach
Veronica carsei Petrie
Veronica carstensensis Wernham
Veronica × cassinioides Matthews ex Petrie
Veronica catarractae G.Forst.
Veronica catenata Pennell
Veronica caucasica M.Bieb.
Veronica ceratocarpa C.A.Mey.
Veronica cetikiana Öztürk
Veronica chamaedrys L.
Veronica chamaepithyoides Lam.
Veronica chathamica Buchanan
Veronica chayuensis D.Y.Hong
Veronica cheesemanii Benth.
Veronica chinoalpina T.Yamaz.
Veronica chionantha Bornm.
Veronica chionohebe Garn.-Jones
Veronica ciliata Fisch.
Veronica ciliolata (Hook.f.) Cheeseman
Veronica cinerea Boiss. & Balansa
Veronica cockayneana Cheeseman
Veronica colensoi Hook.f.
Veronica colostylis Garn.-Jones
Veronica consolatae Chiov.
Veronica continua B.G.Briggs
Veronica copelandii Eastw.
Veronica corriganii (Carse) Garn.-Jones
Veronica cretacea Ostapko
Veronica crinita Kit. ex Schult.
Veronica crista-galli Steven
Veronica cryptomorpha (Bayly, Kellow, G.E.Harper & Garn.-Jones) Garn.-Jones
Veronica cuneifolia D.Don
Veronica cupressoides Hook.f.
Veronica cusickii A.Gray
Veronica cymbalaria Bodard
Veronica × czemalensis Kosachev & Albach
Veronica czerniakowskiana Monjuschko

D

Veronica dabneyi Hochst. ex Seub.
Veronica daghestanica Trautv.
Veronica dalmatica Padilla-García, Rojas-Andrés, López-González & M.M.Mart.Ort.
Veronica daranica Saeidi & Ghahr.
Veronica daurica Steven
Veronica davisii M.A.Fisch.
Veronica debilis Freyn
Veronica decora (Ashwin) Garn.-Jones
Veronica decorosa F.Muell.
Veronica decumbens J.B.Armstr.
Veronica deltigera Wall. ex Benth.
Veronica densiflora Ledeb.
Veronica densifolia (F.Muell.) F.Muell.
Veronica denudata Albov
Veronica derwentiana Andrews
Veronica dichrus Schott & Kotschy
Veronica dieffenbachii Benth.
Veronica dilatata (G.Simpson & J.S.Thomson) Garn.-Jones
Veronica dillenii Crantz
Veronica diosmifolia A.Cunn.
Veronica diosmoides Schltr.
Veronica dissecta (Rydb.) M.M.Mart.Ort. & Albach
Veronica distans R.Br.
Veronica × divergens Cheeseman
Veronica donetzica Ostapko
Veronica donii Römpp

E–F

Veronica elliptica G.Forst.
Veronica elmaliensis M.A.Fisch.
Veronica emodi T.Yamaz.
Veronica epacridea Hook.f.
Veronica × erecta Kirk
Veronica erinoides Boiss. & Spruner
Veronica eriogyne H.J.P.Winkl.
Veronica ersin-yucelii Yaylacı, O.Koyuncu & Ocak
Veronica euphrasiifolia Link
Veronica evenosa Petrie
Veronica × fairfieldii Hook.f.
Veronica fargesii Franch.
Veronica farinosa Hausskn.
Veronica fedtschenkoi Boriss.
Veronica ferganica Popov
Veronica filifolia Lipsky
Veronica filiformis Sm.
Veronica filipes P.C.Tsoong
Veronica flavida (Bayly, Kellow & de Lange) Garn.-Jones
Veronica formosa R.Br.
Veronica forrestii Diels
Veronica fragilis Boiss. & Hausskn.
Veronica × franciscana Eastw.
Veronica francispetae M.A.Fisch.
Veronica fraterna N.E.Br.
Veronica fridericae M.A.Fisch.
Veronica fruticans Jacq.
Veronica fruticulosa L.
Veronica fuhsii Freyn & Sint.

G–H

Veronica galathica Boiss.
Veronica gandhii Kottaim.
Veronica gaubae Bornm.
Veronica gentianoides Vahl
Veronica gibbsii Kirk
Veronica glandulosa Hochst. ex Benth.
Veronica glauca Sm.
Veronica glaucophylla Cockayne
Veronica × godronii Rouy
Veronica gorbunovii Gontsch.
Veronica gracilis R.Br.
Veronica grandiflora Gaertn.
Veronica × grisea Kosachev & A.L.Ebel
Veronica grisebachii Walters
Veronica grosseserrata B.G.Briggs & Ehrend.
Veronica gunae Schweinf. ex Engl.
Veronica haastii Hook.f.
Veronica hectorii Hook.f.
Veronica hederifolia L.
Veronica henryi T.Yamaz.
Veronica heureka (M.A.Fisch.) Tzvelev
Veronica hillebrandii F.Muell.
Veronica himalensis D.Don
Veronica hispidula Boiss. & A.Huet
Veronica hookeri (Buchanan) Garn.-Jones
Veronica hookeriana Walp.
Veronica hulkeana F.Muell. ex Hook.f.

I–K

Veronica idahoensis M.M.Mart.Ort. & Albach
Veronica incana L.
Veronica inflexa Albach
Veronica insularis Cheeseman
Veronica intercedens Bornm.
Veronica ionantha Albach
Veronica japonensis Makino
Veronica javanica Blume
Veronica jovellanoides Garn.-Jones & de Lange
Veronica kaiseri Täckh.
Veronica kellowiae Garn.-Jones
Veronica khorassanica Czerniak.
Veronica kindlii Adamović
Veronica × kirkii J.B.Armstr.
Veronica × kolyvanensis Kosachev & Shmakov
Veronica kopetdaghensis B.Fedtsch. ex Boriss.
Veronica kopgecidiensis Öztürk & M.A.Fisch.
Veronica kotschyana Benth.
Veronica krasnoborovii Kosachev & Shaulo
Veronica krylovii Schischk.
Veronica kurdica Benth.

L

Veronica × lackschewitzii J.Keller
Veronica laeta Kar. & Kir.
Veronica × laevastonii (Cockayne & Allan) Garn.-Jones
Veronica lanceolata Benth.
Veronica lanosa Royle ex Benth.
Veronica lanuginosa Benth. ex Hook.f.
Veronica lavaudiana Raoul
Veronica laxa Benth.
Veronica laxissima D.Y.Hong
Veronica leiocarpa Boiss.
Veronica leiophylla Cheeseman
Veronica × leiosala (Cockayne & Allan) Garn.-Jones
Veronica lendenfeldii F.Muell.
Veronica × lewisii J.B.Armstr.
Veronica ligustrifolia A.Cunn.
Veronica lilliputiana Stearn
Veronica linariifolia Pall. ex Link
Veronica linearis (Bornm.) Rojas-Andrés & M.M.Mart.Ort.
Veronica linifolia Hook.f.
Veronica lithophila (B.G.Briggs & Ehrend.) B.G.Briggs
Veronica liwanensis K.Koch
Veronica × loganioides J.B.Armstr.
Veronica longifolia L.
Veronica longipedicellata Saeidi
Veronica longipetiolata D.Y.Hong
Veronica luetkeana Rupr.
Veronica lyallii Hook.f.
Veronica lycica E.Lehm.
Veronica lycopodioides Hook.f.

M–N

Veronica maccaskillii (Allan) Heenan
Veronica macrantha Hook.f.
Veronica macrocalyx J.B.Armstr.
Veronica macrocarpa Vahl
Veronica macropoda Boiss.
Veronica macrostachya Vahl
Veronica macrostemon Bunge
Veronica magna M.A.Fisch.
Veronica × major (Benth.) Wettst.
Veronica mampodrensis Losa & P.Monts.
Veronica mannii Hook.f.
Veronica masoniae (L.B.Moore) Garn.-Jones
Veronica matthewsii Cheeseman
Veronica × mauksii Hulják
Veronica mazanderanae Wendelbo
Veronica × media Schrad.
Veronica melanocaulon Garn.-Jones
Veronica mexicana S.Watson
Veronica michauxii Lam.
Veronica micrantha Hoffmanns. & Link
Veronica microcarpa Boiss.
Veronica miqueliana Nakai
Veronica mirabilis Wendelbo
Veronica missurica Raf.
Veronica monantha Merr.
Veronica montana L.
Veronica montbretii M.A.Fisch.
Veronica monticola Trautv.
Veronica mooreae (Heads) Garn.-Jones
Veronica morrisonicola Hayata
Veronica multifida L.
Veronica muratae T.Yamaz.
Veronica murrellii (G.Simpson & J.S.Thomson) Garn.-Jones
Veronica × myriantha Tosh.Tanaka
Veronica nakaiana Ohwi
Veronica nevadensis (Pau) Pau
Veronica nipponica Makino ex Furumi
Veronica nivea Lindl.
Veronica notabilis F.Muell. ex Benth.
Veronica notialis Garn.-Jones
Veronica novae-hollandiae Poir.
Veronica nummularia Gouan

O

Veronica oblongifolia (Pennell) M.M.Mart.Ort. & Albach
Veronica obtusata Cheeseman
Veronica ochracea (Ashwin) Garn.-Jones
Veronica odora Hook.f.
Veronica oetaea Gustavsson
Veronica officinalis L.
Veronica ogurae (T.Yamaz.) Albach
Veronica olgensis Kom.
Veronica oligosperma Hayata
Veronica oltensis Woronow
Veronica onoei Franch. & Sav.
Veronica opaca Fr.
Veronica orbiculata A.Kern.
Veronica orchidea Crantz
Veronica orientalis Mill.
Veronica ornata Monjuschko
Veronica orsiniana Ten.
Veronica ovata Nakai
Veronica oxycarpa Boiss.
Veronica ozturkii Yıld.

P–Q

Veronica paederotae Boiss.
Veronica panormitana Tineo ex Guss.
Veronica papuana (P.Royen & Ehrend.) Albach
Veronica pareora (Garn.-Jones & Molloy) Garn.-Jones
Veronica parnkalliana J.M.Black
Veronica parviflora Vahl
Veronica parvifolia Vahl
Veronica pauciramosa (Cockayne & Allan) Garn.-Jones
Veronica paysonii (Pennell & L.O.Williams) M.M.Mart.Ort. & Albach
Veronica pectinata L.
Veronica peduncularis M.Bieb.
Veronica pentasepala (L.B.Moore) Garn.-Jones
Veronica perbella (de Lange) Garn.-Jones
Veronica peregrina L.
Veronica perfoliata R.Br.
Veronica persica Poir.
Veronica petraea Steven
Veronica petriei (Buchanan) Kirk
Veronica phormiiphila Garn.-Jones
Veronica pimeleoides Hook.f.
Veronica pinguifolia Hook.f.
Veronica pinnata L.
Veronica piroliformis Franch.
Veronica planopetiolata G.Simpson & J.S.Thomson
Veronica plantaginea E.James
Veronica platyarpa Pennell
Veronica plebeia R.Br.
Veronica polifolia Benth.
Veronica polita Fr.
Veronica polium P.H.Davis
Veronica poljensis Murb.
Veronica ponae Gouan
Veronica pontica (Rupr. ex Boiss.) Wettst.
Veronica poppelwellii Cockayne
Veronica porphyriana Pavlov
Veronica praecox All.
Veronica propinqua Cheeseman
Veronica prostrata L.
Veronica pubescens Banks & Sol. ex Benth.
Veronica pulvinaris (Hook.f.) Cheeseman
Veronica punicea Garn.-Jones
Veronica pusanensis Y.N.Lee
Veronica pusilla Kotschy ex Boiss.
Veronica pyrethrina Nakai
Veronica quadrifaria Kirk
Veronica quezelii M.A.Fisch.

R

Veronica rakaiensis J.B.Armstr.
Veronica ramosissima Boriss.
Veronica ranunculina (Pennell) M.M.Mart.Ort. & Albach
Veronica raoulii Hook.f.
Veronica rapensis F.Br.
Veronica rechingeri M.A.Fisch.
Veronica regina-nivalis M.M.Mart.Ort. & Albach
Veronica repens Clarion ex DC.
Veronica reuteriana Boiss.
Veronica reverdattoi Krasnob.
Veronica rhodopea (Velen.) Degen ex Stoj. & Stef.
Veronica riae H.J.P.Winkl.
Veronica rigidula Cheeseman
Veronica ritteriana (Eastw.) M.M.Mart.Ort. & Albach
Veronica rivalis Garn.-Jones
Veronica robusta (Prain) T.Yamaz.
Veronica rockii H.L.Li
Veronica rosea Desf.
Veronica rotunda Nakai
Veronica rubra (Douglas ex Hook.) M.M.Mart.Ort. & Albach
Veronica rubrifolia Boiss.
Veronica rupicola Cheeseman

S

Veronica sajanensis Printz
Veronica salicifolia G.Forst.
Veronica salicornioides Hook.f.
Veronica samuelssonii Rech.f.
Veronica × sapiehae (Błocki ex Holub) Albach
Veronica × sapozhnikovii Kosachev
Veronica sartoriana Boiss. & Heldr.
Veronica satureiifolia Poit. & Turpin
Veronica saturejoides Vis.
Veronica saxicola (de Lange) Heenan
Veronica scardica Griseb.
Veronica schistosa E.A.Busch
Veronica schizantha (Piper) M.M.Mart.Ort. & Albach
Veronica × schmakovii Kosachev
Veronica schmidtiana Regel
Veronica scopulorum (Bayly, de Lange & Garn.-Jones) Garn.-Jones
Veronica scrupea Garn.-Jones
Veronica scutellata L.
Veronica senex (Garn.-Jones) Garn.-Jones
Veronica sennenii (Pau) M.M.Mart.Ort. & E.Rico
Veronica serpyllifolia L.
Veronica × sessiliflora Bunge
Veronica siaretensis E.Lehm.
Veronica sibthorpioides Debeaux ex Degen & Herv.
Veronica sieboldiana Miq.
Veronica simensis Fresen.
Veronica × simmonsii Cockayne
Veronica simulans Garn.-Jones
Veronica × smirnovii Kosachev & D.A.German
Veronica sobolifera B.G.Briggs & Ehrend.
Veronica societatis (Bayly & Kellow) Garn.-Jones
Veronica spathulata Benth.
Veronica speciosa R.Cunn. ex A.Cunn.
Veronica spectabilis (Garn.-Jones) Garn.-Jones
Veronica spicata L.
Veronica spirei Bonati
Veronica spuria L.
Veronica stamatiadae M.A.Fisch. & Greuter
Veronica stelleri Pall. ex Schrad. & Link
Veronica stenophylla Steud.
Veronica steppacea Kotov
Veronica stewartii Pennell
Veronica stricta Banks & Sol. ex Benth.
Veronica strictissima (Kirk) Garn.-Jones
Veronica strigosa Albach
Veronica stylophora Popov ex Vved.
Veronica subalpina Cockayne
Veronica subfulvida (G.Simpson & J.S.Thomson) Garn.-Jones
Veronica sublobata M.A.Fisch.
Veronica subsessilis (Miq.) Furumi
Veronica subtilis B.G.Briggs & Ehrend.
Veronica surculosa Boiss. & Balansa
Veronica sutchuenensis Franch.
Veronica syriaca Roem. & Schult.
Veronica szechuanica Batalin

T

Veronica tairawhiti (B.D.Clarkson & Garn.-Jones) Garn.-Jones
Veronica taiwanica T.Yamaz.
Veronica taurica Willd.
Veronica tauricola Bornm.
Veronica teberdensis (Kem.-Nath.) Boriss.
Veronica telephiifolia Vahl
Veronica tenuifolia Asso
Veronica tenuissima Boriss.
Veronica tetragona Hook.
Veronica tetrasticha Hook.f.
Veronica teucrioides Boiss. & Heldr.
Veronica teucrium L.
Veronica thessalica Benth.
Veronica thomsonii (Buchanan) Cheeseman
Veronica thracica Velen.
Veronica thymifolia Sm.
Veronica thymoides P.H.Davis
Veronica tianschanica Lincz.
Veronica tibetica D.Y.Hong
Veronica topiaria (L.B.Moore) Garn.-Jones
Veronica townsonii Cheeseman
Veronica traversii Hook.f.
Veronica treadwellii (Cockayne & Allan) Garn.-Jones
Veronica trichadena Jord. & Fourr.
Veronica trifida Petrie
Veronica triloba (Opiz) Opiz
Veronica triphyllos L.
Veronica truncatula Colenso
Veronica tsinglingensis D.Y.Hong
Veronica tubata (Diels) Albach
Veronica tumadzhanovii Mardal.
Veronica tumida Kirk
Veronica turrilliana Stoj. & Stef.

U–Z

Veronica umbelliformis Pennell
Veronica undulata Wall.
Veronica × uniflora Kirk
Veronica urticifolia Jacq.
Veronica urvilleana (W.R.B.Oliv.) Garn.-Jones
Veronica utahensis M.M.Mart.Ort. & Albach
Veronica vandellioides Maxim.
Veronica vandewateri Wernham
Veronica velutina (B.G.Briggs & Ehrend.) B.G.Briggs
Veronica vendettadeae Albach
Veronica venustula Colenso
Veronica verna L.
Veronica vernicosa Hook.f.
Veronica viscosa Boiss.
Veronica × wallii Garn.-Jones
Veronica wilhelminensis Albach
Veronica wormskjoldii Roem. & Schult.
Veronica wyomingensis (A.Nelson) M.M.Mart.Ort. & Albach
Veronica yildirimlii Öztürk
Veronica yunnanensis D.Y.Hong
Veronica zygantha Garn.-Jones

References

 
Veronica